Bryan Tay (born Tay Zhi Rong, born 13 April 1988) is a Singaporean swimmer, who specialized in individual and relay freestyle events. He is also a multiple-time medalist for the individual events, and a two-time defending champion for the relay freestyle events at the Southeast Asian Games.

Tay was the sole male swimmer for the Singapore national team at the 2008 Summer Olympics in Beijing, and competed for the men's 200 m freestyle. He won the second heat of the competition, and set a national record, with a time of 1:50.41, 0.86 seconds ahead of Estonia's Vladimir Sidorkin. Tay, however, failed to advance into the semi-final rounds, as he placed forty-first in the overall rankings.

Tay was also a member and varsity player of the Princeton Tigers swimming team at Princeton University.

See also
 List of Princeton University Olympians

References

External links
 
 
 
 Bryan Tay – Princeton Tigers
 
 

1988 births
Living people
Singaporean male freestyle swimmers
Olympic swimmers of Singapore
Swimmers at the 2008 Summer Olympics
Swimmers at the 2006 Asian Games
Singaporean expatriates in the United States
Southeast Asian Games medalists in swimming
Southeast Asian Games gold medalists for Singapore
Southeast Asian Games bronze medalists for Singapore
Competitors at the 2005 Southeast Asian Games
Competitors at the 2007 Southeast Asian Games
Asian Games competitors for Singapore
20th-century Singaporean people
21st-century Singaporean people